The Dorasque were a warlike people who lived in the valleys of the Chiriquí Viejo, Changuena and Diquis rivers, and possibly a little farther east along the Pacific Ocean.  They are seen as more "civilized" than neighboring groups.  They are often credited as having made the pottery and gold ornaments found in the ancient graves of Chiriquí.  They had trade relations with Niquirans and Chorotegans, of Costa Rica.

They spoke the Dorasque language.

References 

Indigenous peoples of Central America